Monasteries and other sites related to the Dominican Order can be found in numerous countries around the world. This incomplete list is ordered geographically using contemporary country boundaries, which often differ from historical order, and to the extent possible, chronological order of Dominican affiliation within each country. Dates of affiliation with the Order are indicated in parentheses.

Europe

Austria
  in Friesach (since 1217)
  in Lienz (since 1218)
 Dominican Monastery in Wiener Neustadt (1227-1444), later  
  in Krems an der Donau (1236-1786)
  and Dominican Church in Vienna (since 1237)
 St. Peter an der Sperr in Wiener Neustadt (c.1240s-1544)
  in Graz (c.1270-1783)
 Convent of St. Peter in Bludenz (since 1286, with interruptions)
  in Graz (14th century-1585)
  in Bregenz (1436-1782)
 Dominican Friary in Steyr (1472-1865), now 
  in Feldkirch, Vorarlberg (since 1551)
  in Münzbach (1661-1784)
  in Windhaag bei Perg (1664-1782), now 
  in Vienna (since 1870)
  in Bregenz (since 1904)
  in Kramsach (1971-2010)

Belgium
  in Ghent (1220-1796)
 Dominican friary in Bruges (1234-1796)
 St. Paul's Church in Antwerp (1276-1802, with interruption 1578–1584)
  in Brussels (since 1901)
  in Tournai (1904-1939), original location of Le Saulchoir theological school

Bosnia and Herzegovina
 Fethija Mosque in Bihać (1266-1592)

Croatia
  in Dubrovnik (1225-19th century?)
  in Stari Grad, Hvar (1479-1571)

Czechia
  in Znojmo (since c.1230s, with interruptions)
 Dominican Monastery in České Budějovice (1260s-1785)
 St. Catherine Monastery in Olomouc (1287-1782)
  in Tachov (1331-17th century)

Denmark
 Dominican Priory in Viborg (1227-1529)
 St. Catherine's Priory in Ribe (1228-1536)
 Our Lady's Priory in Aarhus (c.1230-1536)
 St. Catherine's Priory in Roskilde (1231-1537)
 St. Agnes' Priory in Roskilde (1264-1527)
 Holbæk Priory in Holbæk (1275-1535)
 St. Agnes' Priory in Gavnø (1398-1536)

Estonia
 St. Catherine's Monastery in Tallinn (1246-1524)

France
 Notre-Dame-de-Prouille Monastery in rural Aude (1206 or 1207-1793 and since 1856)
  in Angers (1216-1790)
 Couvent des Jacobins de la rue Saint-Jacques in Paris (1218-1790)
 Dominican Convent in Strasbourg (1224-1531), now Temple Neuf
  in Aix-en-Provence (1226-1790)
  and Church of the Jacobins in Toulouse (1229-1791); burial place of Thomas Aquinas
  in Nantes (c.1230-1790)
  in Colmar (1232-1790), now Unterlinden Museum
  in Valenciennes (1233-1790)
 Église Notre-Dame-de-Confort in Lyon (1235-1790)
  in Avignon (1241-1790)
  in Auxerre (1245-1790)
  in Reims (1245-1790)
  in Sélestat (1245-1792)
  in Perpignan (c.1245-1793)
  in Agen (1249-1790)
  near Ribeauvillé (1250-1790)
  in Colmar (1277-1790)
 Couvent des Jacobins in Saint-Sever (1280-1790)
  in Aix-en-Provence (1290-1790)
  in Collioure (1290-1790)
  in Saintes (1292-1790)
  in Saint-Maximin-la-Sainte-Baume (1295-1790)
  in Pont-l'Évêque, Calvados (13th century?-1790)
  in Carpentras (1312-1790)
  in Belvès (1321-1790)
  in Rennes (1367-1793)
  in Wittenheim (1397-1790)
 Dominican Friary in Auch (15th century?-1790), now Musée des Jacobins
  in Laval (1487-1790)
 Église Saint-Cannat in Marseille (1526-1790)
  in Vieux-Thann (1534-1790)
 Couvent des Jacobins de la rue Saint-Honoré in Paris (1611-1790)
 Dominican novitiate on Rue Saint-Dominique in Paris (1631-1790), now CHurch of Saint-Thomas-d'Aquin
  in Bordeaux (1684-1790)
  in Viviers, Ardèche (1734-1790)
 Flavigny Abbey in Flavigny-sur-Ozerain (since the 1840s)
 Monastère de Chalais near Voreppe (1844-1887 and since 1963)
 Couvent Saint-Jacques in Paris (since 1849), home of Le Saulchoir theology school since 1971
  in Corbara, Haute-Corse (1856-1992, with interruption 1903–1927)
 Dominican Nuns of the Perpetual Rosary in Calais (since 1880)
  in Nice (since 1939)
 Sainte Marie de La Tourette in Éveux near Lyon (since 1943)
  in Bouvines (1945-2003)
  in Lille (since 1952)
  in Crots (since 1972)
  in Salernes (since 1980)
  in Avrillé, Maine-et-Loire (since 1982)

Germany
 Dominicans Island on Lake Constance (1220-1785)
  in Cologne (1221-1802)
  in Halberstadt (1224-c.1800)
  in Magdeburg (1224-1561)
  in Trier (c.1225-1802)
 Predigerkirche in Erfurt (1229-1588)
  in Regensburg (1229-1806)
  in Koblenz (c.1230-1802)
  in Soest (c.1230-1812)
  and Paulinerkirche in Leipzig (1231-1544)
  in Esslingen am Neckar (1233-1532)
 Dominican Monastery in Frankfurt am Main (1233-1803)
  in Hildesheim (1233-1546)
 Dominican Convent in Regensburg (since 1233)
  in Nuremberg (1234-1525)
  in Griesstätt (1235-1822), now 
  in Trier (1235-1802)
  in Freiburg im Breisgau (c.1235-1794)
  in Hamburg (1236-1529 and since 1962)
  in Minden (1236-1736)
 Kirchberg convent in Sulz am Neckar (1237-1865)
  in Wünschendorf/Elster (1238-1544)
  in Schwäbisch Gmünd (1240-1803)
  in Schwarzhofen (c.1240-1285 and 1691–1802)
 St Catharine's Convent in Augsburg (1243-1802), now 
  in Lambrecht, Rhineland-Palatinate (1244-1553)
  in Mödingen (1246-1802)
  in Nürnberger Land (1248-1565)
  in Friedrichshafen (1250-1806)
  in Pforzheim (c.1250-1564)
  in Wildberg, Baden-Württemberg (1252-1535)
 St Catherine's Monastery in Bremen (1253-1528)
  in Greifswald (1254-1566)
  in Rostock (1256-1534)
  in Cologne (1257-1802)
  in Mainz (1257-1789)
  in Ostrach (1259-1840)
  in Bad Saulgau (1260-1860)
  in Speyer (1262-1802)
  near Treis-Karden (1262-1272)
  in Medlingen (1263-1555 and 1651–1804)
  in Bad Wimpfen (1264-1818)
  in East Frisia (1264-1527)
  in Würzburg (1266-1813)
  in Erlangen (1267-1549)
  in Rottweil (1268-1803)
  in Bad Mergentheim (c.1270-1805)
  in Eichstätt (1271-1806)
  in Donaueschingen (1274-1559)
  in Prenzlau (1275-1545)
  in Hechingen (1278-1802)
  in Worms (1278-1570)
  in Mengen (1280-1826)
 Dominican Convent in Osnabrück (1283-1803), now 
  in Warburg (1283-1803)
  in Lauffen am Neckar (1285-1466)
  in Röbel (1285-1540s)
  in Brandenburg an der Havel (1286-1560)
  in Jena (1286-1548)
 University Church of Marburg in Marburg (1291-1526)
  in Wesel (1291-1807)
  in Wismar (1293-1562)
 SS. Peter and Paul's Church in Göttingen (1294-1529)
  in Oldenburg (1294-1577)
  in Dornstetten (1295-1588)
 Katharinenkirche in Nuremberg (1295-1596)
  in Berlin (c.1297-1536)
  in Pirna (since c.1300)
  in Bamberg (1310-1806)
  in Speyer (1304-1802)
  in Augsburg (1312-1802)
  in Konstanz (since 1318)
 Propsteikirche, Dortmund in Dortmund (1330-1816)
  in Augsburg (1335-1803 and since 1828)
  in Treysa (1350-1526)
  in Bamberg (1365-1806 and since 1926)
 Liebenau monastery near Worms (1430-1565)
  in Stuttgart (1471-16th century)
  in Meschede (1473-1820)
  in Meschede (1483-1810)
  in Gronau, Lower Saxony (1680-1815)
  in Freiburg im Breisgau (1687-1867), formed by merger of several earlier Dominican houses, now 
  in Münster (1708-1811)
  in Bad Wörishofen (1718-1802 and since 1842)
  in Heidelberg (1720-1802)
  in Fremdingen (1737-1802 and since 1828)
  in Landsberg am Lech (since 1845)
  in Niederviehbach (since 1847)
 Wettenhausen Abbey in Kammeltal (since 1864)
  in Düsseldorf (1867-1973)
  in Dießen am Ammersee (1867-1917)
  in Koblenz (since 1868)
  in Berlin (since 1869)
 Polling Abbey in Polling, Weilheim-Schongau (since 1892)
  in Mindelheim (1902-2001)
  in Vechta (since 1902)
 Schlehdorf Abbey in Schlehdorf (since 1904)
  in Roding (since 1917)
  in Bad Brückenau (1921-1955)
  in Bornheim-Walberberg (1925-2007)
  in Leipzig (since 1931)
  in Augsburg (since 1936)
 St. Andrew's Church in Cologne (since 1947); burial place of Albertus Magnus
 Theatine Church in Munich (since 1954)
  in Braunschweig (since 1958)
  in Neustadt am Main (since 1961)
  in Rieste (1999-2020)
  in Berlin (since 2000)
  in Freiburg im Breisgau (since 2009)

Greece
  in Chania (c.1320-1645)

Hungary
  in Vértes Hills (1478-16th century)
  in Sopron (1719-1780s)

Ireland
 Black Abbey in Kilkenny (1225-1558, 1640s, late 1680s, and since 1776)
 Athenry Abbey in Athenry (1241-1574)
 St. Dominic's Abbey in Cashel, County Tipperary (1243-1540 and 18th-19th centuries)
 Strade Abbey in County Mayo (1252-1578 and 18th century)
 Roscommon Abbey in Roscommon (1253-1570s)
 Sligo Abbey in Sligo (1253-1913, with interruptions)
 Athy Priory in Athy (c.1253-1539 and 1622-19th century)
 North Abbey in Youghal (1268-16th century)
 Rathfran Friary in County Mayo (1274-1577)
 Carlingford Abbey in Carlingford, County Louth (c.1305-1540s)
 Aghaboe Abbey in County Laois (1382-1540)
 Portumna Abbey in Portumna (1426-1698)
 Burrishoole Friary in County Mayo (1470-16th century)
  in County Sligo (1488-1584)
 Ballindoon Friary in County Sligo (1507-c.1585)
 Castlelyons Friary in County Cork (1683-1760)
 Dominican College Sion Hill in Blackrock, Dublin (since 1836)
 Newbridge College in Newbridge, County Kildare (since 1852)
 Priory of the True Cross in Arklow, County Wicklow (land granted by Henry II in 1264 and founded by Theobald FitzWalter or Theobald le Botiller, dissolved in 1539) (also known as Holy Cross Abbey, Arklow Abbey or Arklow Friary)
 St. Mary’s Priory, Tallaght, Dublin, established in 1855.
 St. Saviour’s Priory, Dublin, consecrated in 1861.

Italy
 San Sisto Vecchio in Rome (since 1218)
 San Domenico in Bologna (since 1219), burial place of Saint Dominic
 Church of Santa Sabina in Rome (since 1220), mother church of the order
 Santa Maria Novella in Florence (since 1221)
 Basilica of San Domenico in Siena (since 1226)
 Santa Caterina del Sasso in Leggiuno (since 1230)
 Church of San Domenico Maggiore in Naples (since 1231, with 19th-century interruptions)
 Santi Giovanni e Paolo in Venice (1234-1807)
  in Algund (1243-1782)
  in Faenza (13th century-2008)
 Church of San Giacomo Apostolo in Forlì (13th century-1867)
 Matris Domini Monastery in Bergamo (since 1258)
 Chiesa dei Domenicani in Bolzano (since the 1260s)
 Santa Maria sopra Minerva in Rome (since 1275, with interruptions in the 1810s and 1870s) and nearby , built in 1641; burial place of Catherine of Siena and Fra Angelico
 Church of Sant'Anastasia in Verona (since 1280)
 Church of San Domenico in Palermo (since c.1280)
  in Chioggia (1287-1806)
 Convent of Corpus Domini in Venice (1394-1810)
 Convent of San Domenico in Fiesole (since 1406)
 Convent of San Marco in Florence (1437-2014, with 19th-century interruptions), now Museo Nazionale di San Marco
 Santa Maria di Castello in Genoa (1441-2015)
 Friary of Santa Maria delle Grazie in Milan (since 1463)
 Sanctuary of the Virgin of Taburnus in Bucciano (since 1498)
 Church of Santa Maria della Pietà in Palermo (since 1526)
 Santi Domenico e Sisto in Rome (since 1569); the adjacent convent has housed the Pontifical University of Saint Thomas Aquinas since 1928
 Santa Maria della Sanità in Naples (since 1577)
 Santissima Trinità a Via Condotti in Rome (since 1880)

Latvia
 Basilica of the Assumption in Aglona (since 1699, with interruptions)

Lithuania
 Dominican Church of the Holy Spirit in Vilnius (1501-1807)
 Church of St. Philip and St. Jacob in Vilnius (1624-1812, 1920s-1948 and since 1992)

Luxembourg
  in Marienthal (13th century-1783)

Malta
 Basilica of St Dominic in Valletta (since 1571)
 Our Lady of Pompei Church in Victoria, Gozo (since 1889)

Netherlands
 Grote of Jacobijnerkerk in Leeuwarden (1245-1570s)
 Kloosterkerk in The Hague (1397-1574)

Poland
 Basilica of Holy Trinity in Kraków (since 1223); burial place of Hyacinth of Poland
 Dominican Church and Convent of St. James in Sandomierz (since 1226, with interruptions)
  in Wrocław (1226-1810)
  in Kamień Pomorski (1227-1540)
  in Chełmno (1238-1829)
  in Elbląg (1239-1542)
  in Toruń (1263-1820)
  in Słupsk (since 1278)
  in Wrocław (1295-1810)
  in Ińsko (c.1308-1535)
 Church of St. Giles in Kraków (since the 15th century?)
 St. Hyacinth's Church in Warsaw (since 1603)
  in Kraków (since 1627)
 Sanctuary of Our Lady of Dzików in Tarnobrzeg (since 1677)
 Convent of the Dominican Sisters in Tarnobrzeg (since 1861)

Portugal
 Batalha Monastery in Batalha (1385-1834)
 Cathedral of Vila Real in Vila Real (1425-1834)
 Igreja de São Gonçalo in Amarante (since 1540)

Romania
 Monastery Church in Sighișoara (1289-1888)

Russia
  in Zheleznodorozhny, Kaliningrad Oblast (1407-1567)
 Church of St. Catherine in Saint Petersburg (1815-1892)

Slovakia
 Church of the Assumption of the Virgin Mary in Košice (c.1290-1780s)

Slovenia
  in Kranj (1248-1782)

Spain
 Convent of San Domingos de Bonaval in Santiago de Compostela (1220s-1830s)
 Convent of Santo Domingo in Valencia (1239-1835)
 Dominican Convent in Zaragoza (1250-19th century)
 Convent of Saint Dominic in Girona (1253-1827)
 Convento de San Esteban, Salamanca in Salamanca (since c.1255)
 Iglesia de San Pablo in Valladolid (since 1270)
 Dominican Friary in Pontevedra (1282-1836), now Ruins of San Domingos
 Monastery of Santo Domingo el Real in Toledo (since 1364)
 Nuestra Señora de la Soterraña in Santa María la Real de Nieva (1399-1835)
 Convento de San Pedro Mártir in Toledo (since 1407)
 Convento de las Dueñas in Salamanca (since 1419)
 Real Monasterio de Santo Tomás in Ávila (since 1482)
 Colegio de San Gregorio in Valladolid (1487-1820)
 Convento de la Madre de Dios in Toledo (late 15th century-19th century)
  in Talavera de la Reina (16th century?-1830s)
  in Pollença, Mallorca (16th-19th centuries)
 Convento de Santo Tomás in Madrid (1563-1835)
  in Los Corrales de Buelna (1605-1835 and since 1877)
  in Lerma (since 1613)
  in Peña de Francia (since 1900)
  in Almagro, Ciudad Real (since 1903)
 Monastery of the Mother of God in Olmedo (since the 1950s)

Sweden
  in Lund (1221-1520s)
  in Visby (1228-1525)
 St. Mary's Church in Sigtuna (1237-1527)
  in Åhus (1243-16th century)
  in Västerås (1244-1527)
  in Halmstad (c.1260-1531)
 Skänninge Abbey in Skänninge (1272-1544)
 St. John's Priory in Kalmar (1299-1505)
 Black Friars' Monastery in Stockholm (1336-1547)

Switzerland
  in Basel (c.1230-16th century)
 Predigerkloster and Predigerkirche in Zürich (c.1231-1524)
 Töss Monastery in Winterthur (1233-16th century)
  in Basel (1233-1529)
  in Diessenhofen (1245-1869)
 Weesen Abbey in Weesen (since 1256)
  in Bern (1269-1534)
  in Aarau (1270-1528)
 Dominican Nunnery in Basel (1274-1557), now 
 Oetenbach nunnery in Zürich (1286-1525)
  in Chur (1288-1539)
  in Estavayer-le-Lac (since 1316)
  in St. Gallen (1368-1594)
  in Cazis (since 1647)
 Dominican Convent in Ilanz (since 1894)

Turkey
 Arap Mosque in Istanbul (1325-1475)

Ukraine
 Dominican Church in Lviv (1234-1946)
 Old Cathedral of St. Sophia in Kyiv (17th century)
 Cathedral of the Immaculate Conception of the Blessed Virgin Mary in Ternopil (18th century and since 1903, with interruptions)
 Superior Institute of Religious Sciences of St. Thomas Aquinas in Kyiv (since 1992)

United Kingdom

England
 Blackfriars in Oxford (1221-1530s and since 1921)
 Holborn Priory in London (1220s-1310s)
 Blackfriars in Derby (c.1230-1539)
 Blackfriars in Cambridge (1238-1538 and since 1938)
 Blackfriars in Gloucester (1239-1539)
 Blackfriars in Newcastle upon Tyne (1239-1536)
 Beverley Friary in Beverley (c.1240?-1539)
 Chester Dominican Friary in Chester (13th century-1530s)
 Blackfriars in Exeter (13th century-1538)
 Friary in Ilchester (13th century-1538)
 Blackfriars, Thetford in Norfolk (13th century-1530s), now Thetford Grammar School
 Dominican Friary in Winchester (13th century-1530s)
 Dominican Friary in York (13th century-1530s)
 Dunstable Friary in Dunstable (1259-1539)
 Blackfriars in Ipswich (1263-1538)
 Black Friary in Guildford (1272-1538)
 Blackfriars in Leicester (1284-1538)
 St. Andrew's and Blackfriars' Hall in Norwich (1307-1530s)
 Priory in Kings Langley (1308-1535 and 1557–1558)
 Blackfriars and St Ann Blackfriars in London (c.1317-1538)
 Melcombe Priory in Melcombe Regis (1418-1538)
 St Dominic's Priory Church in London (since 1861)
 St Dominic's Church, Newcastle, (1863–2016)
 Holy Cross Priory in Leicester (since 1882)
 Hawkesyard Priory, Staffordshire (1896–1988)
 The Abbey in Storrington (since 1953)
 St Cuthbert's Church in Durham (2012-2016)

Northern Ireland
 Dominican College in Portstewart (since 1917)
 Dominican College, Fortwilliam in Belfast (since 1930)

Scotland
 Blackfriars in Stirling (1233-1559)
 Blackfriars in Perth (1240-1569)
 Blackfriars in Montrose, Angus (13th century-1571)
 Blackfriars in Wigtown (c.1280s-1560s)
 Blackfriars in St Andrews (15th century-1559)
 St Columba's Catholic Church, Glasgow (2005–2016)
 St Albert's Catholic Chaplaincy, Edinburgh (since 1931)

Africa, Asia and Oceania

Australia
 St Mary's College in Adelaide, South Australia (since 1869)
 St Dominic's Priory College in North Adelaide, South Australia (since 1884)
 Cabra Dominican College in Cumberland Park, South Australia (since 1886)
 Dominican School in Semaphore, South Australia (since 1899)
 Siena College in Camberwell, Victoria (since 1940)
 Blackfriars Priory School in Prospect, South Australia (since 1953)

China
 Saint Dominic's Cathedral in Fuzhou (1864-1911)

Taiwan
 Blessed Imelda's School in Taipei (since 1916)
 Dominican International School in Taipei (since 1957)

Democratic Republic of Congo
  in Isiro (since 1998)

Egypt
 Dominican Institute for Oriental Studies in Cairo (since 1953)

Iran
 Church of Our Lady of the Rosary in New Julfa, Isfahan (1681-18th century)
 Saint Abraham's Church in Tehran (since 1966)

Iraq
 Our Lady of the Hour Church in Mosul (1866-2014)

Israel
 École Biblique in Jerusalem (since 1890)
 St. Stephen's Basilica in Jerusalem (since 1900)

New Zealand
 St Dominic's Catholic College in Auckland (since 1952)
 St Dominic's College in Whanganui (since 1994)

Pakistan
 Monastery of the Angels in Karachi (since 1959)

Philippines
 Manaoag Church in Manaoag (since 1605)
 Santa Catalina de Siena Church in Bambang, Nueva Vizcaya (since 1609)
 Dominican college in Manila (since 1611), from 1645 University of Santo Tomas
 Colegio de San Juan de Letran in Intramuros, Manila (since 1620)
 Saints Peter and Paul Parish Church in Calasiao (since 1621)
 Santa Catalina College in Manila (since 1696), originally in Intramuros and since 1951 in Sampaloc
 Holy Trinity University in Puerto Princesa (since 1940)
 Saint Michael Academy in Catarman, Northern Samar (since 1946)
 Dominican College of Tarlac in Capas (since 1947)
 San Pedro College in Davao City (since 1956)
 Siena College of Taytay in Taytay, Rizal (since 1957)
 Dominican School Manila in Sampaloc, Manila (since 1958)
 Siena College of Quezon City in Quezon City (since 1959)
 University of Santo Tomas–Legazpi in Legazpi, Albay (since 1965)
 Aquinas School in San Juan, Metro Manila (since 1965)
 UST Angelicum College in Quezon City (since 1972)
 Angelicum School Iloilo in Iloilo City (since 1978)
 Siena College of San Jose in San Jose del Monte, Bulacan (since 1988)
 Dominican College of Santa Rosa in Santa Rosa, Laguna (since 1993)

Zimbabwe
 Dominican Convent High School in Harare (since 1892)
 St Dominic's Chishawasha near Harare (since 1898)
 Emerald Hill School in Harare (since 1914)
 St. John's High School in Emerald Hill, Harare (since 1925)
 Dominican Convent High School in Bulawayo (since 1956)

Americas

Argentina
 Santo Domingo Convent in Buenos Aires (since 1606, with interruption c.1825-1835)
 Saint Thomas Aquinas University of the North in San Miguel de Tucumán (since 1965)

Canada
 Dominican University College in Ottawa (since 1900)

Colombia
 Colegio Jordán de Sajonia in Bogotá (since 1954)
 Colegio Lacordaire in Cali (since 1956)

Dominican Republic
  in Santo Domingo (1510-1823), from 1538 Universidad Santo Tomás de Aquino

Ecuador
 University of Saint Thomas Aquinas in Quito (1681-1826), now Central University of Ecuador

Guatemala
  in Guatemala City (since 1776, with interruptions)

Mexico
 Santo Domingo in Mexico City (since 1526)
 Church of Santo Domingo and Chapel of the Rosario in Puebla (since 1531)
 Porta Coeli Cathedral in Mexico City (1603-20th century)
  in San Cristóbal de las Casas (since 1547)

Peru
 Convent of Santo Domingo in Lima (since the 1530s)
 Convent of Santo Domingo in Cusco (since 1534)
 Monastery of Santa Catalina de Siena in Arequipa (since 1579)

United States
 St. Rose Priory near Springfield, Kentucky (since 1806)
 Dominican School of Philosophy and Theology in Berkeley, California (since 1851)
 St. Dominic Catholic Church in Washington, D.C. (since 1853)
 St. Mary's Dominican High School in New Orleans (since 1860)
 Dominican College in Racine, Wisconsin (1864-1974)
 Church of St. Vincent Ferrer in New York City (since 1867)
 St. Dominic Church in San Francisco (since 1873)
 Saint Patrick Church in Columbus, Ohio (since 1885)
 Aquinas College in Grand Rapids, Michigan (since 1886)
 Dominican University of California in San Rafael, California (since 1890)
 Corpus Christi Monastery in New York City (since 1891)
 Dominican University in River Forest, Illinois (since 1901)
 Dominican House of Studies in Washington, D.C. (since 1905)
 Saint Agnes Academy in Houston (since 1906)
 Blessed Sacrament Church in Seattle (since 1908)
 St. Mary's Dominican College in New Orleans (1910-1984)
 Ohio Dominican University in Columbus, Ohio (since 1911)
 Blue Chapel in Union City, New Jersey (since 1912)
 Providence College in Providence, Rhode Island (since 1917)
 Albertus Magnus College in New Haven, Connecticut (since 1925)
 Aquinas Institute of Theology in St. Louis (since 1925)
 Edgewood College in Madison, Wisconsin (since 1927)
 Fenwick High School in Oak Park, Illinois (since 1929)
 St. Catharine College near Springfield, Kentucky (1931-2016)
 Caldwell University in Caldwell, New Jersey (since 1939)
 Barry University in Miami Shores, Florida (since 1940)
 Molloy College in Rockville Centre, New York (since 1941)
 Dominican College in Orangeburg, New York (since 1952)
 Marian Catholic High School in Chicago Heights, Illinois (since 1955)
 Mount Saint Mary College in Newburgh, New York (since 1959)
 Bishop Lynch High School in Dallas (since 1963)
 Dominican Sisters of the Heart of Jesus in Lockport, Louisiana (since 1981)
 St. Vincent Ferrer Church in River Forest, Illinois

Uruguay
 Nuestra Señora del Rosario y Santo Domingo in Montevideo (since 1947)

See also
 List of Knights Templar sites
 List of Knights Hospitaller sites
 List of Jesuit sites

References

Dominican Order
Dominican Order
Dominican Order